Central Lithuania may refer to:
Republic of Central Lithuania, a short-lived Poland-dependent puppet state created in 1920 in the Vilnius Region
The central region in the geography of Lithuania, around Kaunas, Kėdainiai, and Jonava